Sir William Essex (1477–1548) of Lambourn, Berkshire was an English soldier and courtier who served as High Sheriff and Member of Parliament.

Origins
He was the son of Thomas Essex of Lambourn in Berkshire by his wife, Elizabeth Babthorpe, a daughter of William Babthorpe of Ellistown in Leicestershire.

He served as High Sheriff of Berkshire and High Sheriff of Oxfordshire in 1509, 1518, 1523 and 1540 and as one of the MPs for Berkshire in 1529–1536 and 1542–1544.

He fought as a captain in the French campaigns of 1512 and 1513 and was knighted at Tournai. As a courtier he attended the wedding of Mary Tudor to Louis XII of France. He was also present in 1520 at the Field of Cloth of Gold and the meeting with Charles V at Gravelines.

Marriage and children
He married Elizabeth Rogers, daughter and heiress of Thomas Rogers of Beckett Hall in Shrivenham, Berkshire (now Oxfordshire). They had two children: 
Sir Thomas Essex, who married Margaret Sandys, a daughter of Lord Sandys (Sandes) of the Vyne, Hampshire; his monument with recurrent effigies of himself and his wife survive in the Church of St Michael and All Angels, Lambourn.
Winifred Essex who married Sir Richard Edgcumbe

References

External links
Royal Berkshire History: Sir William Essex (1477-1548)

1477 births
1548 deaths
People from Lambourn
High Sheriffs of Berkshire
High Sheriffs of Oxfordshire
Knights Bachelor
15th-century English people
Members of the Parliament of England for Berkshire
English MPs 1529–1536
English MPs 1542–1544